Wholeness may refer to:

 Holism,  the idea that systems and their properties should be viewed as wholes, not just as a collection of parts
 Integrity, the ethical quality of being honest and having strong moral principles
 Wholeness (album)

See also
Whole (disambiguation)
Completeness (disambiguation)
Totality (disambiguation)